Vanan (also Romanized as Vānān; also known as Vānūn) is a village in Lar Rural District, Laran District, Shahrekord County, Chaharmahal and Bakhtiari Province, Iran. At the 2006 census, its population was 3,044, in 693 families. The village is populated by Persians.

References 

Populated places in Shahr-e Kord County